Twentieth Century Club may refer to:

 Twentieth Century Club (Buffalo, New York), listed on the National Register of Historic Places, the first club run by women, for women, in the United States
 Twentieth Century Club of Lansdowne in Pennsylvania, listed on the National Register of Historic Places
 20th Century Club (Reno, Nevada) listed on the National Register of Historic Places in Washoe County, Nevada
 Twentieth Century Club (Pittsburgh) at the University of Pittsburgh, a contributing property to the Schenley Farms National Historic District

See also
 Century Club (disambiguation)
 New Century Club (disambiguation)